The Dive Bar Tour is a promotional concert tour by American country music singer Garth Brooks. The tour, sponsored by Seagram, was in support of Brooks' and Blake Shelton's single, "Dive Bar", and visited seven dive bars in the United States.

Background
On July 7, 2019, Brooks announced the Dive Bar Tour in support of his single with Blake Shelton, "Dive Bar",  via Facebook Live.

Despite already embarking on his Stadium Tour throughout North America, Brooks visited seven cities for the Dive Bar Tour, performing at various dive bars throughout the country. Tickets for each show were only available via contest through each city's country radio stations.

In promotion of the tour and single, Brooks' Chicago performance of "Dive Bar" was aired on Jimmy Kimmel Live!.

Critical response
Steve Johnson of the Chicago Tribune praised the tour, stating, "Brooks fist-pumped, finger-pointed and humbly hat-doffed his way through a honky-tonk jukebox worth of old hits, one new single (twice) and some touching homages to country legends in a show that lasted a surprisingly generous 100 minutes." He continued, "if you accept that the golden ratio in concert-going is size of talent to size of room, then this one was special, a night to get close and personal with a performer typically seen from, at best, binocular distance in a hockey arena."

Set list 
This set list is representative of the performance of October 16, 2019 in Sanford. It does not represent all concerts for the duration of the series.

 "All Day Long"
 "Rodeo"
 "Two of a Kind, Workin' on a Full House"
 "Two Piña Coladas"
 "The River"
 "Much Too Young (To Feel This Damn Old)"
 "To Make You Feel My Love"
 "Unanswered Prayers"
 "Ain't Going Down ('Til the Sun Comes Up)"
 "That Summer"
 "Fishin' in the Dark" (Nitty Gritty Dirt Band cover)
 "The Thunder Rolls"
 "Callin' Baton Rouge"
 "Dive Bar"
 "Friends in Low Places"
 "The Dance"

Shows

References

2019 concert tours
2020 concert tours
Concert tours of the United States
Concert tours of North America
Garth Brooks concert tours